Donald Ray Buckram, Jr. (born February 9, 1988) is an American football coach and former running back. He played college football for the UTEP Miners football team. In 2009, he led Conference USA in rushing with 1,594 yards and 18 touchdowns, including 262 yards in a win over the #14 ranked University of Houston Cougars. In December 2009, he was named a Fourth team All-American by Phil Steele. 

In July 2011, he was released by the Cleveland Browns after failing a physical.

He now coaches Running backs at Copperas Cove High School with Head Coach Jason Hammett.

See also 
 List of NCAA major college football yearly scoring leaders

References

1988 births
Living people
American football running backs
UTEP Miners football players
Players of American football from Texas
People from Fort Hood, Texas